"Somewhere" is a song by American singer Shanice. It was the lead single to her third album, 21... Ways to Grow (1994), and was released three days after Shanice turned 21 years old.

Critical reception
Troy J. Augusto from Cash Box wrote, "Promising R&B singer looks to make her move to the top o’ the charts with this hardhitting, funky hip-hop number that oozes with radio accessibility and dance-floor hook. A big jump for Shanice, whose forthcoming 21... Wavs album just may be the one to put her in the big leagues with Mariah, Janet, Toni, et al. Bright, bouncy tune reflects serious maturation from the singer’s earlier material. Could be the start of something quite big." Martin Johnson from Chicago Reader remarked that on the album’s "most natural-sounding tracks", as "Somewhere", "she sounds self-assured and determined to elaborate her priorities."

Track listing
 12" single
A1. "Somewhere" (Nothin' But Da Funk Mix) (4:16)
A2. "Somewhere" (LP Version) (4:10)
A3. "Somewhere" (Instrumental) (5:08)
B1. "Somewhere" (Deep Soul Mix) (5:08)
B2. "Somewhere" (A Capella) (4:13)

 CD single
1. "Somewhere" (Nothin' But Da Funk Mix) [4:18]
2. "Somewhere" (Deep Soul Mix) [5:11]
3. "Somewhere" (LP Version) [4:15]
4. "Somewhere" (Instrumental) [5:08]

Charts

References

1994 singles
Shanice songs
1993 songs
Songs written by Shanice
Motown singles
Songs written by Christopher Williams (singer)